Miridius is a genus of mostly European bugs in the family Miridae and tribe Mirini, erected by Franz Xaver Fieber in 1858.

Species 
The following are included:
 Miridius longiceps Wagner, 1955
 Miridius multidentatus Carapezza, 1997
 Miridius pallidus Horvath, 1887
 Miridius quadrivirgatus (A. Costa, 1853)
 Miridius rubrolineatus (Poppius, 1912) (synonym M. loriae Poppius, 1914)

References

External links
 
 
 

Miridae genera
Hemiptera of Europe
Mirini